
Sheering is a civil parish and village in the Epping Forest district of Essex, England. The Stort Navigation to the west has a lock at Sheering Mill. Lower Sheering, adjacent to Sawbridgeworth in Hertfordshire and its railway station, forms part of the civil parish.

Sheering village has approximately 350 households. There is a Church of England primary school and two public houses, The Cock Inn and The Crown, a general store with a post office, a sandwich shop and a hairdresser's.

Bus services connect Sheering to Harlow and Chelmsford.

The Parish Church of St Mary the Virgin  on Church Lane, Sheering is a Grade I listed building. Four other buildings  in the parish are Grade II* listed.

See also
 Harry Goschen, baronet of Durrington House in the Parish of Sheering and County of Essex
 Steve Harris (musician) of Iron Maiden
 The Hundred Parishes

References

External links

Sheering Village website

Epping Forest District
Villages in Essex